Castilleja campestris is a species of Indian paintbrush known by the common name vernal pool Indian paintbrush. It is native to California and southern Oregon, where it grows in seasonally moist habitat, especially vernal pools.

Description
It is an annual herb growing 10 to 30 centimeters tall with linear or narrowly lance-shaped leaves up to 4 centimeters long. The inflorescence is up to 15 centimeters long. It is filled with leaflike green bracts which are generally not tipped with another color. The flower is yellow or orange.

Subspecies
There are two subspecies of this plant. The rare Castilleja campestris subspecies succulenta, the succulent owl's clover or fleshy Indian paintbrush, is endemic to California and limited to the San Joaquin Valley of California and adjacent lower Sierra Nevada foothills, where its vernal pool habitat has been largely eliminated for human activity such as agriculture and development.

External links
Jepson Manual Treatment: Castilleja campestris
Castilleja campestris Photo gallery
Photo gallery: Castilleja campestris ssp. succulenta

campestris
Plants described in 1839
Flora of California
Flora of Oregon
Flora without expected TNC conservation status